The Syria–Turkey barrier is a border wall and fence under construction along the Syria–Turkey border built in an attempt at preventing illegal crossings and smuggling from Syria into Turkey.

The barrier on the Syrian border is the third longest wall in the world after the Great Wall of China and the American-Mexico border wall.

Background 
According to Turkish officials the border wall was built in an attempt to increase border security, combat smuggling and reduce illegal border crossings due to the Syrian civil war.

History 
Ankara had launched the construction project in 2015 to increase border security.

The 828 km (515-mile)  wall is being built by TOKI, Turkey's state-owned construction enterprise, and will comprise Turkey's entire border with Syria. With construction having begun in 2014, 781 km of the border wall has been completed as of December 2017. In June 2018, the wall was proclaimed to be finished with a length of 764-kilometer (475-mile) out of the 911 km Syrian-Turkish border. In 2017, The Syrian government accused Turkey of building a separation wall, referring to this barrier.

Specifics

The physical specifics are such as :

 base element: 2m wide, 7-tons mobile concrete blocks
 height : 3m concrete + 1m razor wire
 length : 764 km
 sealed along : Hatay, Kilis, Gaziantep, Mardin, Şırnak, Şanlıurfa, as of June 2018,

The border security includes :

 the modular concrete walls
 security patrol routes with regular military patrols 
 security towers, manned and unmanned
 passenger tracks.

Electronic devices are used, such as :
 close-up surveillance systems
 thermal cameras
 land surveillance radar
 remote-controlled weapons systems
 command-and-control centers
 line-length imaging systems
 seismic sensors
 acoustic sensors.

The advanced technology layer includes : 
 wide area surveillance
 laser destructive fiber-optic detection
 surveillance radar for drone detection
 jammers
 short-distance movement-sensitive lighting systems.

The barrier was expected to include 120 border towers in critical locations.

The construction of Turkey's armored Cobra II military vehicles, which are now being used to patrol the border to Syria, has been funded by the European Union.

Geography and size
781 km of the border wall has been completed as of December 2017, the whole 911 km is expected to be completed by Spring 2018.

Separation barrier and incursion into Syria controversy
In 2017, the Syrian government accused Turkey of building a separation wall, referring to the barrier. Syrian Foreign Ministry officials claimed Turkish forces and border control guards brought in heavy machines and trucks into Syrian territories, particularly in the northern countryside of Hasakah province, making a dirt road and digging a trench while installing cement pillars to build a separation wall. Turkish forces were also claimed to enter the Syrian territory at a depth of 250 meters in the northern countryside of Aleppo province. The Turkish forces also repeated the move in the northwestern province of Idlib, saying that the Turkish forces captured six acres of lands with the same aim to build the wall. Syrian regime officials have stated that any unilateral international actions without the consent of the Syrian government will be dealt with as violations to Syria's sovereignty.

See also
 Turkey–Iran border barrier
 Mexico–United States barrier

References

External links
Images of the barrier published by the Turkish Ministry of Defense on Twitter

Border barriers
Human migration
Syria–Turkey border
Separation barriers